Fulad Mahalleh (also Romanized as Fūlād Maḩalleh) is a village in Poshtkuh Rural District, Shahmirzad District, Mehdishahr County, Semnan Province, Iran. At the 2006 census, its population was 1,344, in 370 families.

References 

Populated places in Mehdishahr County